Startup India is an initiative of the Government of India. The campaign was first announced by Indian Prime Minister, Narendra Modi during his speech on 15 August 2015.

The action plan of this initiative is focussing on three areas:
 Simplification and Handholding.
 Funding Support and Incentives.
 Industry-Academia Partnership and Incubation.

An additional area relating to this initiative is to discard restrictive States Government policies within this domain, such as License Raj, Land Permissions, Foreign Investment Proposals, and Environmental Clearances. It was organized by The Department for promotion of industry and internal trade (DPI&IT). 

Under this initiative, the government has already launched the I-MADE program, to help Indian entrepreneurs build 10 lakh (1 million) mobile app start-ups, and the MUDRA Bank's scheme (Pradhan Mantri Mudra Yojana), an initiative which aims to provide micro-finance, low-interest rate loans to entrepreneurs from low socioeconomic backgrounds. Initial capital of  has been allocated for this scheme.

Recently Indian Prime Minister announced "India will celebrate January 16 as ‘National Start-up Day". Hon’ble PM awarded 48 startups on the eve of first National startup day. This time from Pune, Maharashtra, four startups got the award.

Key points
 10,000 crore startup funding pool.
 Reduction in patent registration fees.
 Improved Bankruptcy Code, to ensure a 90-day exit window.
 Freedom from inspections for the first 3 years of operation.
 Freedom from Capital Gain Tax for first 3 years of operation.
 Freedom from tax for the first 3 years of operation.
 Self-certification compliance. 
 New schemes to provide IPR protection to startup firms.
 Built Startup Oasis as Rajasthan Incubation Center.

Launch
The event was inaugurated on 16 January 2016 by The Former Finance Minister of India Arun Jaitley. Among the attendees were CEOs, startup founders and venture capitalists.

Government's role
Entrepreneurship is made above posts like organized and policy pillar, opportunity of capital and entrepreneurial civilization. In an emerging society such as India, the government should regulate entrepreneurship and encourage commercialization of bright plans by imitating the startup environment in the expanded states.

The Ministry of Human Resource Development and the Department of Science and Technology have agreed to partner in an initiative to set up over 75 such startup support hubs in the National Institutes of Technology (NITs), the Indian Institutes of Information Technology (IIITs), the Indian Institutes of Science Education and Research (IISERs) and National Institutes of Pharmaceutical Education and Research (NIPERs).

The Department for Promotion of Industry and Internal Trade (DPIIT) is mandated to coordinate implementation of Startup India initiative with other Government Departments. Apart from DPIIT, the initiatives under Startup India are driven primarily by five Government Departments viz. Department of Science and Technology (DST), Department of Bio-technology (DBT), Ministry of Human Resource Development (MHRD), Ministry of Labour and Employment, Ministry of Corporate Affairs (MCA) and NITI Aayog. Government of India has made fast paced efforts towards making the vision of Startup India initiative a reality. Substantial progress has been made under the Startup India initiative, which has stirred entrepreneurial spirit across the country.

The Reserve Bank of India said it will take steps to help improve the ‘ease of doing business’ in the country and contribute to an ecosystem that is conducive for the growth of start-up businesses.

Proactive action from state and central government is spurring growth and fostering the entrepreneurial culture in the country. The government initiatives and policies are creating a favourable environment for startups, enabling expansion of infrastructure, co-working spaces, incubators, accelerators and in certain cases access to funding and market.

Investments
SoftBank, which is headquartered in Japan, has invested  into Indian startups. The Japanese firm has pledged to invest . Oracle on 12 February 2016 announced that it will establish nine incubation centers in Bengaluru, Chennai, Gurgaon, Hyderabad, Mumbai, Noida, Pune, Trivandrum and Vijayawada. Rs 1000 crore Fund of Funds for startups are reserved for women-led startups.

On fifth anniversary of the Startup India initiative, PM Modi announces Rs 1,000 crore 'Startup India Seed Fund'

State initiatives

Kerala has initiated a government startup nodal agency called Kerala Startup Mission (KSUM). KSUM supports startup ecosystem by means of different components such as Infrastructure, Human Capital Development, Funding, Governance, Public-Private partnerships, Global collaborations, Scaling Existing, and Establishing New startup ventures from Startup-Boot Up-Scale up model for moving fast from ideas to IPO. The state also matches the funding raised by its incubator from Central government with 1:1. 

Telangana has taken “exemplary initiatives” by establishing the exclusive women’s incubator WE HUB, the Telangana Innovation Fund (T-Fund, an early stage investing vehicle in collaboration with global investor), and the government mentor program (GMP) to bridge the gap between states and startups. 

Andhra Pradesh has allocated a 17,000-sq.ft. Technological Research and Innovation Park as a Research and Development laboratory.

Rajasthan has launched iStart Rajasthan & India's largest business incubation center - Bhamashah Techno Hub.

In order to promote start-ups in Odisha, the state government organised a two-day Start-up Conclave in Bhubaneswar on 28 November 2016.

Maharashtra State Innovation Society (MSInS) presented Maharashtra’s Startup pillars & best practices for the participating states, explaining the journey of building an innovative and entrepreneurial culture in the state. The state officials visited the Society for Innovation and Entrepreneurship (SINE), an umbrella organization at the Indian Institute of Technology (IIT), Mumbai for fostering entrepreneurship and nurturing tech startups. Field visits to Biomedical Engineering and Technology In Biomedical Incubation Center (BETiC), IIT Mumbai, and Research Innovation Incubation Design Labs (Riidl) were also conducted.

Kerala Startup Mission, the state nodal agency for supporting technology startups in the state had envisaged and constructed the Technology Innovation Zone which is a 13-acre Startup Campus where multiple sector incubators and accelerators come together with industry participation. The state officials visited the Integrated Startup Complex, BioNest, and InQ Co-Working Space.

Indian states with their own startup initiatives as of June 2017 include West Bengal, Uttar Pradesh, Odisha, Rajasthan, Karnataka, Gujarat, Jharkhand, Goa, Andhra Pradesh, Bihar, Chhattisgarh, Kerala, Madhya Pradesh, Telangana, and Uttarakhand.

State rankings 

The result of first ever startup state ranking were announced in December 2018 by the 
Department of Industry and Internal Trade based on the criteria of policy, incubation hubs, seeding innovation, scaling innovation, regulatory change, procurement, communication, North-Eastern states, and hill states.

The 2018 Startup State Rankings are:
 Best performer: Gujarat
 Top performers: Karnataka, Kerala, Odisha, and Rajasthan
 Leader: Andhra Pradesh, Bihar, Chhattisgarh, Madhya Pradesh, and Telangana
 Aspiring leaders: Haryana, Himachal Pradesh, Jharkhand, Uttar Pradesh, and West Bengal
 Emerging states: Assam, Delhi, Goa, Jammu and Kashmir, Maharashtra, Punjab, Tamil Nadu, and Uttarakhand

 Beginners: Chandigarh, Manipur, Mizoram, Nagaland, Puducherry, Sikkim, and Tripura

The second edition of the exercise was launched in 2019 and has now been completed with active participation of 22 states and 3 Union Territories.

After the successful completion of a rigorous evaluation process, Shri Piyush Goyal, Hon’ble Minister of Railways and Commerce & Industry, announced the results of the 2nd edition of States’ Startup Ranking on 11 September 2020, at an event held at the National Media Centre, New Delhi.

 Best performer: Gujarat, Andaman & Nicobar Island
 Top performers: Karnataka, Kerala
 Leader: Maharashtra, Odisha, Rajasthan, Bihar, Chandigarh
 Aspiring leaders: Telangana, Uttarakhand, Haryana, Jharkhand, Punjab, Nagaland
 Emerging startup ecosystems: Chhattisgarh, Himachal Pradesh, Andhra Pradesh, Tamil Nadu, Madhya Pradesh, Uttar Pradesh, Assam, Delhi, Mizoram, Sikkim.

Higher education alliances
As per the "Industry-Academia Partnership and Incubation" focus of the Startup India initiative, the Union Ministry of Human Resource Development has announced plans for the development of "Research Parks" to be created in partnership with higher education providers across India. An initial investment of Rs.100 crore, has been set aside for the program, which aims to provide students with access to funds and mentorship for startups.

The Innovation in Mobile App Development Ecosystem (I-MADE) program was also rolled-out in February 2016. An initiative developed in partnership with The Department Of Telecommunications (Govt of India), Telecom Centers of Excellence (TCOE), EVC Ventures, and Unified, it aims to help Indian entrepreneurs create mobile app startups. The program is scheduled to last for 5 years, and has collaborated with 11 Indian universities.

See also
 Digital India
 Khadi 
 Khadi and Village Industries Commission
 Ministry of Micro, Small and Medium Enterprises
 Mahatma Gandhi Institute for Rural Industrialization
 National Charkha Museum
 National Handloom Day of India
 Make in India 
 Pradhan Mantri Jan Dhan Yojana
 Skill India
 Standup India
 Swadeshi Jagaran Manch
 Swaraj

References

 
 

 https://www.startupindia.gov.in/content/dam/invest-india/compendium/National_Report_09092020-Final.pdf
 
 https://www.startupindia.gov.in/content/dam/invest-india/Templates/public/Action%20Plan.pdf
 

Modi administration initiatives
Entrepreneurship in India
2015 establishments in India